Arthur Dixon (17 November 1921 – 3 May 2006) was an English professional footballer who played in the Football League for Northampton Town and Leicester City as an inside forward. He also played in the Scottish League for Heart of Midlothian and Clyde. After his retirement from football, Dixon worked as a masseur and physiotherapist for Notts County.

Personal life 
Dixon was the son of footballer Arthur Dixon.

Career statistics

Honours 
Heart of Midlothian

 East of Scotland Shield: 1947–48

References

English footballers
English Football League players
British Army soldiers
1921 births
2006 deaths
People from Middleton, Greater Manchester
Association football inside forwards
Scottish Football League players
Queen's Park F.C. players
Clyde F.C. players
Heart of Midlothian F.C. players
Northampton Town F.C. players
Leicester City F.C. players
Kettering Town F.C. players
Notts County F.C. non-playing staff
Southern Football League players
Footballers from Rochdale
Footballers from Glasgow
Anglo-Scots
Military personnel from Manchester